The Maple Hill Bridge is an automobile crossing of the Kansas River near Maple Hill, Kansas.  The bridge provides quick access to U.S. Highway 24 to the north and Interstate 70 to the south.

Bridges over the Kansas River
Road bridges in Kansas
Buildings and structures in Wabaunsee County, Kansas